Corsair (Major Christopher Summers, USAF) is a fictional character appearing in American comic books published by Marvel Comics. The character is depicted as a star-faring hero who leads the Starjammers, and the father of X-Men superheroes Cyclops and Havok, and the supervillain Vulcan. He first appeared in The Uncanny X-Men #104, and was created by Dave Cockrum.

Concept and creation
Dave Cockrum created the Starjammers with the intent of having them star in their own series. However, when he submitted the concept for Marvel's two try-out series, Marvel Spotlight and Marvel Premiere, he was repeatedly informed that these series were booked for two years solid. Running out of patience, Cockrum showed the Starjammers, including Corsair, to X-Men writer Chris Claremont, and convinced him to use the characters for this series. In order to provide a plausible excuse for the Starjammers to make repeat appearances in X-Men, they decided to make Corsair the father of Cyclops, leader of the X-Men.

Fictional character biography

Origins
Many years ago, a test pilot for NASA, United States Air Force Major Christopher Summers, was flying himself, his wife Katherine Anne, and their two young sons Scott and Alex in their private airplane, a rebuilt de Havilland Mosquito, down the Western American coast from Alaska when their plane was attacked by a starship from the alien Shi'ar Empire on an exploratory mission to Earth. The Shi'ar pursued Summers' craft to prevent Summers from making their presence on Earth known to the general public. The Shi'ar craft fired on Summers' plane, which was made of wood, causing it to burst into flame. Unable to find more than one usable parachute in time, Katherine Anne put it on her eldest son Scott, told him to hold onto Alex, and pushed them both out the plane door, hoping to save them both. Scott and Alex thus escaped the Shi'ar. 

Christopher and his wife were subsequently teleported aboard the Shi'ar starship and taken to the Shi'ar Imperial Throneworld of Chandilar. There, Christopher was separated from his wife and imprisoned. He soon broke free and discovered the mad Shi'ar Emperor D'Ken attempting to rape Katherine Anne. D'Ken responded to the interruption by murdering Summers' wife before his eyes, and then ordered Summers to be sent to the Slave Pits of Alsibar where criminals and political prisoners were incarcerated.

Formation of the Starjammers
In the Pits, Summers met four aliens who had been imprisoned for various crimes against the Shi'ar Empire – a Saurid named Ch'od, a Lupin named Cr'reee, a Mephitisoid whom Summers nicknamed Hepzibah (as her true name was unpronounceable by most not of her own species), and a Shi'ar cyborg named Raza Longknife – and together they escaped and stole a starship. Naming their vessel the Starjammer, and themselves the Starjammers, the group functioned as space pirates targeting Shi'ar vessels, thus taking vengeance on the Shi'ar but taking care not to harm innocent passengers in the process. The Starjammers quickly came to be regarded as outlaws by the Shi'ar Empire. In addition, Summers and Hepzibah became lovers.

X-Men

The Starjammers first met the team of superhuman Earth mutants known as the X-Men when the two groups joined forces on a world in the Shi'ar Galaxy to battle the Imperial Guard, the super-powered soldiers who served the ruling Shi'ar emperor or empress – at the time, D'ken. One of the X-Men, the cosmic being known as the Phoenix who had assumed the form of the X-Man Jean Grey, used her telepathic powers to probe Corsair's mind and learned that he was the father of Scott Summers, who had become the X-Man known as Cyclops. At Corsair's request, Phoenix kept his true identity a secret from Cyclops, but both Cyclops and his brother Alex, who had become the X-Man named Havok, eventually learned who Corsair really was.

Starjammers and the Shi'ar
Since the Starjammers aided her against the machinations of her brother D'Ken, the Shi'ar Princess Lilandra, once she was named Empress in D'Ken's stead, put an unofficial end to the Shi'ar Empire's opposition to the Starjammers. Corsair aided the X-Men against the Sidri, and then admitted to Cyclops that he was his father.

It would not be long before the Starjammers would become outlaws once more. The Starjammers and the X-Men fought the Brood, and battled Lilandra's sister Deathbird. Deathbird's coup d'état was ultimately successful, allowing her to seize the throne. Herself branded a rebel, Lilandra came to join the Starjammers in their fight against Deathbird's tyrannical reign. Later, Corsair rescued Charles Xavier from Fenris and took Xavier into outer space to adventure with the Starjammers and be with his lover Lilandra. Corsair and the Starjammers later embarked on the Phalkon Quest. Eventually, Lilandra and the Starjammers' opposition to Deathbird's rule sparked rebellions across the Empire, and following an attempted takeover of the Empire by the shape-shifting alien Skrulls, Lilandra settled matters with Deathbird, discovering her sister did not want the throne anymore.

The Starjammers subsequently aided Lilandra during the war with the alien Kree Empire, clashed with the Earth team of super-beings known as the Avengers, and were hired by Lilandra to capture the Shi'ar traitor named Cerise. Eventually, the Starjammers would battle with the Shi'ar Empire once more after discovering the poor treatment of the conquered Kree. The Starjammers allied themselves with a group of neutral worlds calling themselves The Clench who provided the pirates with a navigator named Keeyah. During one of the Starjammers' rescue missions, they discovered a vessel belonging to the alien Uncreated, a race of militaristic atheists who intended to destroy any culture that practiced a form of religion, including the Shi'ar. Seeing the Shi'ar as the lesser of two evils, Corsair chose to stop the Uncreated which earned the Starjammers Lilandra's thanks and a pardon for their crimes.

Corsair sought to retire, but soon after the Starjammers were captured by the being known as the Collector. Together with the X-Man Wolverine, the Starjammers managed to escape both the Collector and the cosmic world-devourer known as Galactus. The Starjammers would later aid the Shi'ar in fending off the threat of Galactus, and subsequently helped Lilandra and Xavier during their efforts to free Earth from its sentence as an intergalactic prison planet.

Corsair and Scott reconciled
At one point, Scott was killed by Apocalypse, only to be resurrected after some months. After Scott's revival, Corsair apologized to his son for not checking up on him during his time with the Starjammers. Corsair felt that since he could not keep the plane from crashing and that he could not save his own wife, that Scott and Alex were in better hands in the care of the various homes that his two sons stayed at rather than with him. This apology clearly sunk in: prior to House of M, Cyclops' student team of X-Men was called the Corsairs.

Death
Corsair has been reunited with Havok, his son, who brought him news about Vulcan. Corsair decided to support the X-Men (this time the group includes Rachel Summers, Nightcrawler, Warpath, Darwin, Polaris and Professor X) and Lilandra in preventing D'Ken from becoming emperor once more (with the help of Vulcan and Deathbird). In the midst of a battle between the Shi'ar troops loyal to Lilandra (aided by the Starjammers and X-Men) and Shi'ar troops loyal to D'Ken, Vulcan kills D'Ken and proclaims himself emperor. Corsair commands Vulcan to stop the senseless violence, but Vulcan kills  Corsair. Subsequently, Alex (Havok) becomes the new leader of the Starjammers, who now include Corsair's granddaughter Rachel, Polaris, and original members Ch'od and Raza.

Return
When a time-displaced teenage Jean Grey is kidnapped by the Shi'ar to be placed on trial for her actions as Phoenix, the All-New X-Men and the Guardians of the Galaxy teamed up and traveled through space to save her. It was then that they encountered Corsair, who was alive and well and back in charge of the Starjammers. The time-displaced Cyclops finds out for the first time that his father was alive. Cyclops decided to remain with the Starjammers to catch up with his father. After pillaging a Badoon ship, Corsair and his teenage son decided to travel the galaxy on their own. The time-displaced Cyclops would later learn that the Starjammers under the insistence of Hepzibah, made a deal with the mysterious Shrouded, who brought Corsair back to life. However, his resurrection came at a price, Corsair had to inject himself regularly with a nano-serum containing a collective artificial intelligence. The serum was illegal, banned by all governments across the cosmos due to the threat it posed, as it allowed A.I.s to use a living body as a host. Corsair had to go to great lengths to buy the illegal serum and to avoid arrest but there was no other way he could remain alive.

Powers and abilities
Corsair had no superhuman powers, though he was athletic for a man of his age. He was trained in basic hand-to-hand combat, as well as fencing skills and Shi'ar fighting techniques. He also had extensive knowledge of both terrestrial and Shi'ar weapons, and had exceptional piloting skills in both terrestrial and Shi'ar aircraft and spacecraft. He was usually armed with a saber-like Shi'ar blade, and utilized various Shi'ar weapons as needed which he carried in an extra-dimensional pocket, notable among which were twin energy blasters accessible by pressing the "jewels" on his gauntlets.

Other versions

Age of Apocalypse

In the harsh reality known as Age of Apocalypse, when the war against humanity by Apocalypse was just beginning, Major Christopher Summers wanted to stay and fight, but instead chose to fly his family to Canada to keep them safe.

However, as he was flying his family to safety, their plane was attacked by an alien starship. Summers pushed his sons Alex and Scott out of the plane with their only parachute. He and his wife Katherine were then abducted by the Shi'ar, and Katherine was killed after the Shi'ar, who were implanted by Brood eggs, put her under severe experiments. Meanwhile, Alex and Scott were found and raised by Mr Sinister and eventually became Prelates under the rule of Apocalypse.

Surrounded by prisoners from throughout the galaxy, Summers and his fellow prisoners bonded over their hate for the Shi'ar and formed the Starjammers. Summers eventually led a mutiny against his captors and for years the Starjammers tried to take their revenge on the Shi'ar, who were fighting a losing war of their own against the Brood. Summers apparently began to feel tired and left the Starjammers to return to Earth to reunite with his sons, however on his way, Christopher Summers tragically encountered the Brood once again and while he managed to escape he was implanted with a brood egg. As Summers crashlanded he was immediately captured by Apocalypse's forces. For five years, Hank McCoy studied him, trying to figure out his odd DNA. Mr Sinister kept Summers' presence on Earth hidden from his two sons.

Christopher eventually escaped. He found Joe Robertson who told him what his kids had become. He lost control of his Brood half, killed Robbie, infected him with a Brood egg, and ran. Sinister sent Emplate, the Monets, Northstar and Aurora after him, but Summers shot Emplate through the chest, killing him and frying the Monets' brains. He then blew up a car, knocking out Northstar and Aurora. Summers ran to a scavenger camp, where he killed and infected all of the scavengers and their intended victim Colleen Wing.

Scott and Alex pursued him, not knowing his true identity. After they met him, he convinced them that he was their father. They were attacked by two scavengers, Mister Hyde and Cobra, and Christopher almost lost control again. They ran to an old warehouse to find shelter from the coming storm.

While sweeping the perimeter, Scott encountered a chained Misty Knight along with the bodies of Colleen Wing and the scavengers Christopher had slain. Scott and Knight returned to the warehouse, but Wing and the other "dead" bodies followed and attacked, transformed into Brood. They fought but lost ground until Sinister arrived to save them. Christopher lost control and fully morphed into a Brood. Sinister claimed that he had learned of Christopher's transformation and concealed his return from Scott and Alex until he could cure their father. Christopher attacked Sinister, and then Alex, before regaining enough control to tell Scott to kill him. Scott reluctantly did so. Although Sinister offered to deal with the remains, Alex and Scott cremated Christopher's body, depriving Sinister of the chance to analyze him further and acquire samples of Brood DNA.

Ultimate Corsair
Corsair was referenced in Ultimate X-Men's Sinister storyline, but not as a person. Instead, it was a science fiction world that Cyclops invented after seeing Star Wars. Nick Fury made reference to having served with Cyclops' father in the Gulf War.

X-Men Forever
In the X-Men Forever alternate reality, Corsair and the Starjammers settle down to work as security for Nathan Summers, his grandson, who is living with Corsair's parents in Alaska. This mission suffers several setbacks due to a family friend being a spy for Mister Sinister.

In other media

Television
 Corsair appeared several times during the original X-Men TV series, voiced by Brian Taylor. His story was very similar to the comic book version. In "The Phoenix Saga", Corsair is captain of the Starjammers and crosses paths with the X-Men during his theft of the M'Kraan Crystal. As in the comics, Jean Grey learns who he really is by probing his mind, but she doesn't share this knowledge with anyone. In "Orphan's End", Cyclops sees Corsair's dogtags and locket (which contains a picture of the Summers family) allowing them both to finally learn the truth.
 Very briefly, Corsair is seen in the season one finale of X-Men: Evolution. A flashback that Scott is having details the plane crash that separated him from Scott and Havok. However, since the series never explored the Shi'ar, he is not depicted leading the Starjammers.

Video games
 Corsair appears in the video game Marvel: Ultimate Alliance voiced by Scott MacDonald. He helps the heroes initially escape a Shi'ar attack after they arrive in the Shi'ar galaxy just after Deathbird has staged a coup of Lilandra's throne. He subsequently gives them advice on how to send a message for help while disabling the weapons of the ship the heroes have arrived on so that the arriving fleet won't be destroyed.

See also
 Third Summers brother

References

External links
 Corsair at Marvel.com
 

Characters created by Dave Cockrum
Comics characters introduced in 1977
Fictional space pilots
Fictional United States Air Force personnel
Marvel Comics martial artists
Marvel Comics superheroes
Space pirates